Amandititita (Amanda Lalena Escalante Pimentel) is a Mexican cumbia singer and songwriter. She is the daughter of Rodrigo Gonzalez.

She came to public attention in 2007 as a performer of what she called 'AnarCumbia', a style said to be entirely urban and a blend of rock, reggae, rap, and traditional Mexican cumbia. She was signed by Sony-BMG and released her first album, [ La Reina de Anarcumbia], early in 2008. The single, [ La Muy Muy], from this album, charted on Billboard.

The release of her second album has been announced for 27 October 2009; "La Descarada" with songs of a similar style. In late 2013, she released "Mala Fama" where cumbia is now with modern pop. She has released her first book "13 Latas de Atun" (13 Tuna Cans). In 2015, Amandititita featured as a musical guest on the El Rey network's wrestling show Lucha Underground

Discography 
La Reina de la Anarcumbia (2008)
La Descarada (2009)
Mala Fama (2013)
Pinche Amor (2019)

External links
 Interview in La Jornada 
 Article by Natalia Cano in El Universal 
 

Mexican women singer-songwriters
Mexican singer-songwriters
Singers from Tamaulipas
People from Tampico, Tamaulipas
Living people
1979 births
21st-century Mexican singers
21st-century Mexican women singers